The Government of Ireland Bill 1886, commonly known as the First Home Rule Bill, was the first major attempt made by a British government to enact a law creating home rule for part of the United Kingdom of Great Britain and Ireland. It was introduced on 8 April 1886 by Liberal Prime Minister William Gladstone to create a devolved assembly for Ireland which would govern Ireland in specified areas. The Irish Parliamentary Party under Charles Stewart Parnell had been campaigning for home rule for Ireland since the 1870s.

The bill, like his Irish Land Act 1870, was very much the work of Gladstone, who excluded both the Irish MPs and his own ministers from participation in the drafting. Following the Purchase of Land (Ireland) Act 1885 it was to be introduced alongside a new Land Purchase Bill to reform tenant rights, but the latter was abandoned.

Key aspects
The key aspects of the 1886 bill were:

Legislative
 A unicameral assembly (deliberately not called a parliament to avoid links with the former Irish parliament abolished in 1800 under the Act of Union) consisting of two Orders which could meet either together or separately.
The first Order was to consist of the 28 Irish representative peers (the Irish peers traditionally elected by all Irish peers to sit in the House of Lords at Westminster) plus 75 members elected through a highly restricted franchise. It could delay the passage of legislation for 3 years.
The second Order was to consist of either 204 or 206 members. It had not been decided whether to have two members elected by the graduates of the Royal University to match the two members traditionally elected by graduates of the University of Dublin (Trinity College).
All Irish MPs would be excluded from Westminster altogether.

Executive
 Executive power would be possessed by the Lord Lieutenant of Ireland whose executive would not be responsible to either Order.

Reserve powers
 Britain would still retain control over a range of issues including peace, war, defence, treaties with foreign states, trade and coinage.
 No special provision was made for Ulster.
 Britain would retain control of the Royal Irish Constabulary until it deemed it safe for control to pass to Dublin. The Dublin Metropolitan Police would pass to Irish control.

Reaction
When the bill was introduced, Charles Stewart Parnell had a mixed reaction. He said that it had great faults but was prepared to vote for it. In his famous Irish Home Rule speech, Gladstone beseeched Parliament to pass it and grant Home Rule to Ireland in honour rather than being compelled to one day in humiliation. Unionists and the Orange Order were fierce in their resistance; for them, any measure of Home Rule was denounced as nothing other than Rome Rule. In the staunchly loyalist town of Portadown, the so-called 'Orange Citadel' where the Orange Order was founded in 1795, Orangemen and their supporters celebrated the Bill's defeat by 'Storming the Tunnel'. This was the headline in the local paper where it was reported that a mob attacked the small Catholic/Nationalist ghetto of Obins Street.

The vote on the Bill took place after two months of debate and, on 8 June 1886, 341 voted against it (including 93 Liberals) while 311 voted for it. Parliament was dissolved on 26 June and the UK general election, 1886 was called.  Historians have suggested that the 1886 Home Rule Bill was fatally flawed by the secretive manner of its drafting, with Gladstone alienating Liberal figures like Joseph Chamberlain who, along with a colleague, resigned in protest from the ministry, while producing a Bill viewed privately by the Irish as badly drafted and deeply flawed.

The Liberal Unionist Party was formed, and was generally allied to, or in coalition with, the Conservative Party until the parties merged in 1912.

The 1886 United Kingdom general election was held in July, and led to Conservative and Liberal-Unionist coalition governments for most of the following two decades.

See also 
 1886 Belfast riots
 Government of Ireland Bill 1893 (Second Irish Home Rule Bill)
 Government of Ireland Act 1914 (Third Irish Home Rule Bill)
 Government of Ireland Act 1920 (Fourth Irish Home Rule Bill)
 History of Ireland (1801–1923)

References

Further reading
 University College Cork, History Faculty: Home Rule, The Elections of 1885, 1886
 MacDonagh, Michael: The Home Rule Movement, Talbot Press, Dublin (1920)
 Kee, Robert: The Green Flag: A History of Irish Nationalism (2000 edition, first published 1972), . 
 Hennessey, Thomas: Dividing Ireland: World War I and Partition (1998), .

External links
 Full text of the Home Rule bill of 1886 Appendix A of What home rule means now. (1893, Dublin), The Liberal Union of Ireland; from the Internet Archive. Full text without schedules.
 "Government of Ireland Bill" matches from Hansard; matches 1886–92 relate to the 1886 bill.
 Speech by Charles Stewart Parnell in the House of Commons on the second reading of the bill

1886 in British law
Proposed laws of Ireland
Home rule in Ireland
1886 in Ireland
Proposed laws of the United Kingdom
William Ewart Gladstone